John Skinner (17 May 1744 – 13 July 1816) was an Anglican clergyman who served as the Bishop of Aberdeen from 1786 to 1816 and Primus of the Scottish Episcopal Church from 1788 to 1816.

Early life and family
He was born at Linshart, Longside, Aberdeenshire on 17 May 1744, the second son of the Reverend John Skinner, Incumbent of Lerwick and Grissel Hunter. He was educated at Marischal College, Aberdeen; obtaining a Master of Arts degree in 1761. He married in 1765 to Mary Robertson (1736–1807), and they had five sons and three daughters. One of their sons, John (1769–1841), became Dean of Dunkeld and Dunblane, and another son, William (1778–1857), became Bishop of Aberdeen.

Ecclesiastical career
He was ordained a deacon in 1763 and a priest in 1764. His first pastoral appointment was as the Incumbent of Ellon and Udny (1764–1775), and then the Incumbent of Aberdeen (1775–1816), a post he held until his death. Skinner was appointed coadjutor bishop of Aberdeen and consecrated on 25 September 1782 by bishops Kilgour, Rose and Petrie. He was one of the three bishops to consecrate Samuel Seabury, an American Episcopal priest as a bishop in 1784. On the resignation of Bishop Robert Kilgour, Skinner became Bishop of Aberdeen in October 1786. Two years later, he also became the Primus of the Scottish Episcopal Church.

He died in office in Aberdeen on 13 July 1816, aged 72, and was buried in St Peters Cemetery in the Spital district of Old Aberdeen. He was succeeded by his son, William, as Bishop of Aberdeen.

William Walker wrote a biography of Bishop Skinner.

References

Bibliography

 
  
 Scottish Episcopal Church History "Scottish Episcopal Church History: A Moment in the Century: Persecution and an Argument are Over." Contains information about John Skinner.

 
 
 
 
 
 

1744 births
1816 deaths
18th-century Scottish Episcopalian bishops
19th-century Scottish Episcopalian bishops
Alumni of the University of Aberdeen
Bishops of Aberdeen
Primuses of the Scottish Episcopal Church